Ecdyonurus is a genus of mayflies of the family Heptageniidae.

Species
These 66 species belong to the genus Ecdyonurus:

 Ecdyonurus adjaricus g
 Ecdyonurus alpinus Hefti, Tomka & Zurwerra, 1987 c g
 Ecdyonurus androsianus Braasch, 1983 c g
 Ecdyonurus angelieri Thomas, 1968 c g
 Ecdyonurus asiaeminoris Demoulin, 1973 c g
 Ecdyonurus aurantiacus (Burmeister, 1839) c g
 Ecdyonurus austriacus Kimmins, 1958 c g
 Ecdyonurus autumnalis Braasch, 1980 c g
 Ecdyonurus baeticus Alba-Tercedor & Derka, 2004 c g
 Ecdyonurus bajkovae Kluge, 1986 c g
 Ecdyonurus belfiorei Haybach & Thomas, 2000 c g
 Ecdyonurus bellieri (Hagen, 1860) c g
 Ecdyonurus bellus (Allen and Cohen, 1977) i c g
 Ecdyonurus bimaculatus Tanatmis & Haybach, 2010 c g
 Ecdyonurus carpathicus Sowa, 1973 c g
 Ecdyonurus codinai Navás, 1924 c g
 Ecdyonurus corsicus Esben-Petersen, 1912 c g
 Ecdyonurus cortensis Belfiore, 1987 c g
 Ecdyonurus criddlei (McDunnough, 1927) i c g b (little slate-winged dun)
 Ecdyonurus dispar (Curtis, 1834) c g
 Ecdyonurus diversus Navas, 1923 g
 Ecdyonurus eatoni Kimmins, 1937 c g
 Ecdyonurus epeorides Demoulin, 1955 c g
 Ecdyonurus excelsus Navas, 1927 g
 Ecdyonurus flavimanus Klapalek, 1905 g
 Ecdyonurus flavus Takahashi, 1929 c g
 Ecdyonurus forcipula (Pictet, 1843) c g
 Ecdyonurus fractus Kang & Yang, 1994 c g
 Ecdyonurus fragilis Tiunova, 2006 c g
 Ecdyonurus graecus Braasch, 1984 c g
 Ecdyonurus groehnorum Godunko, 2007 g
 Ecdyonurus helveticus Eaton, 1883 c g
 Ecdyonurus ifranensis Vitte & Thomas, 1988 c g
 Ecdyonurus insignis (Eaton, 1870) c g
 Ecdyonurus klugei Braasch, 1980 c g
 Ecdyonurus krueperi (Stein, 1863) c g
 Ecdyonurus macani Thomas & Sowa, 1970 c g
 Ecdyonurus moreae Belfiore & Braasch, 1986 c g
 Ecdyonurus muelleri Braasch, 1980 c g
 Ecdyonurus naraensis Gose, 1968 c g
 Ecdyonurus nigrescens (Klapálek, 1908) c g
 Ecdyonurus olgae Alba-Tercedor & Derka, 2004 c g
 Ecdyonurus ornatipennis Tshernova, 1938 c g
 Ecdyonurus pallidus Braasch & Soldán, 1982 c g
 Ecdyonurus parahelveticus Hefti, Tomka & Zurwerra, 1986 c g
 Ecdyonurus picteti (Meyer-Dür, 1864) c g
 Ecdyonurus puma Jacob & Braasch, 1986 c g
 Ecdyonurus rizuni Godunko, Klonowska-Olejnik & Soldán, 2004 c g
 Ecdyonurus rothschildi Navás, 1929 c g
 Ecdyonurus rubrofasciatus Brodsky, 1930 c g
 Ecdyonurus ruffii Grandi, 1953 c g
 Ecdyonurus russevi Braasch & Soldán, 1985 c g
 Ecdyonurus silvaegabretae Soldán & Godunko, 2006 c g
 Ecdyonurus simplicioides (McDunnough, 1924) i c g
 Ecdyonurus siveci Jacob & Braasch, 1984 c g
 Ecdyonurus solus Prokopov & Godunko, 2007 c g
 Ecdyonurus starmachi Sowa, 1971 c g
 Ecdyonurus subalpinus (Klapálek, 1907) c g
 Ecdyonurus submontanus Landa, 1970 c g
 Ecdyonurus taipokauensis (Tong & Dudgeon, 2003) c
 Ecdyonurus tonkinensis (Soldán & Braasch, 1986) c g
 Ecdyonurus torrentis Kimmins, 1942 c g
 Ecdyonurus venosus (Fabricius, 1775) c g
 Ecdyonurus vicinus (Demoulin, 1964) c g
 Ecdyonurus vitoshensis Jacob & Braasch, 1984 c g
 Ecdyonurus zelleri (Eaton, 1885) c g

Data sources: i = ITIS, c = Catalogue of Life, g = GBIF, b = Bugguide.net

References

Further reading

External links

 

Mayflies
Mayfly genera